Jim Morgan (28 February 1924 – 26 October 1995) was an  Australian rules footballer who played with Hawthorn in the Victorian Football League (VFL).

Notes

External links 

1924 births
1995 deaths
Australian rules footballers from Victoria (Australia)
Hawthorn Football Club players